Renzo Ulivieri (born 2 February 1941) is an Italian football manager. He is the current chairman of the Associazione Italiana Allenatori Calcio (Italian Football Managers' Association).

Career
After a very short playing career as a midfielder for the Fiorentina youth team and Serie C team Cuoiopelli, Ulivieri became coach for Cuoiopelli in 1966, after the team were relegated to Serie D. He then coached several other amateur teams in Tuscany, such as San Miniato, Fucecchio, and the Prato youth squad.

In 1972, he joined Serie C side Empoli, where he served as head coach for three seasons. He then spent two years as Fiorentina youth coach before Ulivieri signing for Ternana of Serie B in 1978. He made his Serie A debut in 1980 for Perugia. Since then, Ulivieri served as head coach for numerous clubs all around the country. His best results were a double consecutive promotion from Serie C1 to Serie A with Bologna, a Torneo di Viareggio with Fiorentina in 1978, and a promotion to Serie A with Sampdoria in 1981–82. He returned to coach Bologna in 2005, but was fired soon after following a series of poor results. He was however recalled in March 2006, after his replacement Andrea Mandorlini did not manage to improve the team's results. Ulivieri also coached Bologna during the 2006–07 season, but was fired on 14 April 2007 after a 3–0 away loss to Genoa, and following weeks of disputes with club chairman Alfredo Cazzola.

In November 2007 he was appointed at the helm of relegation-battling Serie A side Reggina to replace Massimo Ficcadenti. On 3 March 2008, Ulivieri was sacked by Reggina after a string of results where they picked up only four points from seven league games.

Personal life
Ulivieri is also well known for his left-wing political stance (he is a former Democrats of the Left and Italian Communist Party member). In a 2013 interview with the Italian edition of Vanity Fair, he discussed his left-wing political views, and also spoke out against homophobia in football.

Honours

Manager
Modena
Serie C1: 1989–90

Bologna
Serie C1: 1994–95
Serie B: 1995–96

References

1941 births
Living people
People from San Miniato
Sportspeople from the Province of Pisa
Italian footballers
Footballers from Tuscany
Association football midfielders
ACF Fiorentina players
Italian football managers
Serie A managers
A.C. Perugia Calcio managers
L.R. Vicenza managers
Empoli F.C. managers
Modena F.C. managers
Bologna F.C. 1909 managers
S.S.C. Napoli managers
Parma Calcio 1913 managers
Torino F.C. managers
Cagliari Calcio managers
U.C. Sampdoria managers
Reggina 1914 managers
Ternana Calcio managers
Calcio Padova managers
Italian communists